Road 97 is a road in eastern Iran connecting Mashhad to Taybad. This road is very important because it connects Afghanistan to Mashhad and Tehran Road. All parts of this road is part of AH1.

References

External links 

 Iran road map on Young Journalists Club

AH1
Roads in Iran